= Mohammad Zulkernine =

Canadian computer scientist

Mohammad Zulkernine is a Canadian computer scientist, currently a Canada Research Chair at Queen's University.
